Valencia Basket Club, S.A.D. is a Spanish women's basketball club established in Valencia, that currently plays in the Liga Femenina de Baloncesto. It is the women's team of the namesake club.

History
The women's team of Valencia Basket was created in 2014 after integrating the youth teams of Ros Casares Valencia, former EuroLeague Women champion club which dissolved its senior squad in 2012, into the structure of the club.

In its first season, Valencia Basket played in Primera División, the third tier of Spanish women's basketball.

The club promoted in 2016 to Liga Femenina 2, and two years later, it qualified for the promotion playoffs to the top tier as champions of the Group B and achieved promotion to Liga Femenina, the top tier of Spanish women's basketball, in front of 6,200 spectators. In their debut season, Valencia Basket reached the semifinals.

Season by season

References

External links
 Official website
 Profile at FEB.es 

Basketball teams established in 2014
Sport in Valencia
Women's basketball teams in Spain
Valencia Basket
Basketball teams in the Valencian Community